Emilio Azcárraga is the name of three members of the Azcárraga family:

Emilio Azcárraga Vidaurreta (1895–1972), Mexican businessman
Emilio Azcárraga Milmo (1930–1997), son of Vidaurreta
Emilio Azcárraga Jean (born 1968), son of Milmo